Salvia barrelieri is a perennial found in northern Africa, Morocco, Tunisia, Algeria, and southwestern Spain, usually between the elevations of 500–1200 meters. It grows 1–2 meters tall, with large, wavy, gray-green leaves. The inflorescence is a verticillaster (See Inflorescence) and can grow nearly one meter tall, with flowers of light lavender or sky blue blooming all at the same time.

Notes

barrelieri
Flora of North Africa
Flora of Algeria
Flora of Morocco
Flora of Spain
Flora of Tunisia